The Kissing Bandit is a 1948 American comedy musical western film directed by László Benedek. It stars Frank Sinatra and Kathryn Grayson, with J. Carrol Naish in a supporting role, and Ricardo Montalbán, Ann Miller, and Cyd Charisse in cameo roles.

Plot
In the early nineteenth century, Ricardo, the son of a robber known as the Kissing Bandit, is a shy, Boston-bred young man who does not know how to sit on a horse. He falls for the daughter of the Spanish Governor of California.

Cast

Songs 
 "Tomorrow Means Romance" (music by Nacio Herb Brown; lyrics by William Katz) – Sung by Kathryn Grayson
 "What's Wrong With Me?" (music by Nacio Herb Brown; lyrics by Earl K. Brent) – Sung by Kathryn Grayson, Frank Sinatra
 "If I Steal a Kiss" (music by Nacio Herb Brown; lyrics by Edward Heyman) – Sung by Frank Sinatra; reprised by Kathryn Grayson
 "I Like You" (music by Nacio Herb Brown; lyrics by Edward Heyman) – Sung and danced by Sono Osato
 "Siesta" (music by Nacio Herb Brown; lyrics by Edward Heyman) – Sung by Frank Sinatra
 "Dance of Fury" (music by Nacio Herb Brown) – Danced by Ricardo Montalban, Cyd Charisse and Ann Miller
 "Señorita" (music by Nacio Herb Brown; lyrics by Earl K. Brent) – Sung by Frank Sinatra and Kathryn Grayson 
 "Love Is Where You Find It" (music by Nacio Herb Brown; lyrics by Earl K. Brent) – Sung by Kathryn Grayson

Reception
The film was a financial disaster, earning $969,000 in the US and Canada and $412,000 overseas, resulting in a loss to MGM of $2,643,000. This made it one of the least successful musicals in MGM history.

It was reviewed - unfavourably - in Picturegoer : "the progress of [the] romance is uninspired and very dull. The one worthwhile performance comes from J. Carrol Naish as The Kissing Bandit's henchman."

References

External links
 
 
 
 

1948 films
Metro-Goldwyn-Mayer films
Films produced by Joe Pasternak
Films directed by László Benedek
American Western (genre) musical films
1940s Western (genre) musical films
Films set in the 19th century
American historical musical films
1940s historical musical films
1940s English-language films
1940s American films